Atlanta was an American country music group formed in 1982 in Nashville, Tennessee, USA. It was composed of Brad Griffis (vocals, bass guitar), Bill Davidson (vocals, guitar), Tony Ingram (vocals, fiddle), Alan David (vocals, lead guitar), Allen Collay (vocals, keyboards), Bill Packard (vocals, keyboards), Jeff Baker (bass vocal, harmonica), Dick Stevens (bass), and John Holder (drums). Between 1983 and 1988, Atlanta recorded two albums for MCA Records and charted nine hit singles on the Billboard country chart.

Chart history included two Top 10 country hits in "Atlanta Burned Again Last Night" and "Sweet Country Music". The latter was also the band's highest-charting single, peaking at #2 on Cashbox.

History
Atlanta was formed in 1982 by Brad Griffis (bass guitar), Bill Davidson (vocals, rhythm guitar), Tony Ingram (vocals, fiddle), Alan David (lead guitar), Allen Collay (keyboards), Bill Packard (keyboards), Jeff Baker (harmonica), Dick Stevens (bass), and John Holder (drums). Prior to the foundation, Ingram had recorded on Epic Records in the band Spurzz, and Stevens, Davidson, Griffis, and David had previously toured as a re-establishment of The Vogues. The group was founded through the assistance of record producer Larry McBride, who had also launched the career of Alabama. With nine members, Atlanta was the largest country music band at the time.

"Atlanta Burned Again Last Night" was the band's debut single, released in 1983 on the independent MDJ record label, which McBride owned. This recording spent seventeen weeks on the Billboard country singles chart, peaking at #9. This single was one of the highest-charting debut singles by an independently signed country music act.

After it came the #11 "Dixie Dreaming", the band's second and final MDJ release. By early 1984, MCA Records assumed promotion of the band's singles and albums, releasing "Sweet Country Music" early in the year. It became the band's highest-charting hit, reaching #5 on the Billboard country chart. MCA released the band's debut album Pictures in 1984. MCA also released the singles "Pictures" and "Wishful Drinkin'", the latter of which was included in the film Ellie.

Atlanta released its self-titled second album for MCA in 1985. It included the singles "My Sweet-Eyed Georgia Girl" and "Why Not Tonight", both of which peaked outside the Country Top 40. The band later moved to the Southern Tracks label as Davidson and David left and David was replaced by Jody Worrell on guitar, and releasing "We Always Agree on Love" and "Sad Clichés".

Allen Collay (born Allen Callais on January 1, 1943, in New Orleans) died on February 16, 2010, at age 67.

Discography

Studio albums

Singles

References

Country music groups from Georgia (U.S. state)
Musical groups from Atlanta
Musical groups established in 1983
Musical groups disestablished in 1988
MCA Records artists